Jonnavithula Ramalingeswara Rao is an Indian film lyricist and a poet known for his works in Telugu Cinema. He is also known for his parody songs. He won Filmfare Award for Best Lyricist – Telugu for the film Sri Rama Rajyam (2011).

He wrote 56 poems about Telugu language in the name of Telugu Sankharavam.

Personal life 
Jonnavithula was born on 7 July 1959 in Vijayawada to Subbarao and Lakshmi Narasamma in a Telugu family. His father a teacher in an elementary school. He was also active participant in the mythological dramas.

Selected filmography

References

External links 
 

Living people
Telugu-language lyricists
Indian lyricists
1959 births
People from Krishna district
Indian songwriters
People from Vijayawada
Telugu poets
Indian poets
Poets from Andhra Pradesh
Filmfare Awards South winners